Sabina Mikina (born October 24, 1987 in Baku) is an Azerbaijani sabre fencer. Mikina represented Azerbaijan at the 2012 Summer Olympics in London, where she competed in the women's individual sabre event. She defeated Hungarian-born German fencer Alexandra Bujdoso in the first preliminary round, before losing out her next match to Ukraine's Olga Kharlan, with a final score of 10–15.

References

External links
Profile on Nahouw.net
EuroFencing Profile
NBC Olympics Profile

1987 births
Living people
Azerbaijani female sabre fencers
Olympic fencers of Azerbaijan
Fencers at the 2012 Summer Olympics
Fencers at the 2016 Summer Olympics
Sportspeople from Baku
European Games competitors for Azerbaijan
Fencers at the 2015 European Games
21st-century Azerbaijani women
20th-century Azerbaijani women